The Berlin Document Center (BDC) was created in Berlin, Germany, after the end of World War II. Its task was to centralize the collection of documents from the time of Nazism, which were needed for the preparation of the Nuremberg Trials against war criminals. The BDC was under American administration until 1994, when the German Federal Archives (Bundesarchiv) was allowed to take control of the BDC.  While the paper records remained in Germany, the entire collection was microfilmed and made available at the National Archives in Washington, DC, where researchers have much better access unhindered by restrictive German privacy laws now in effect in Berlin.

The files were rescued from destruction in May 1945 when they were discovered by U.S. Counter Intelligence Corps (CIC) Agents at a paper mill in Freimann, Germany, where they had been shipped by the Nazi leadership to be pulped.

Inventory 
 Central index of members of the NSDAP, 10.7 million record cards (90%)
 60% of the personnel files of the SS, around 600,000
 500,000 files from the 'Main Department of Race and Settlement' (Rasse- und Siedlungs-Hauptamt) of the SS
 1.5 million party correspondences
 Several 100,000s of personal files of the SA, the NS-Teacher Alliance (NS-Lehrerbund, the NS-Alliance of German Technicians (NS Bund Deutscher Techniker) and other NS organisations
 Information on over 2.5 million Volksdeutsche
 Files of the Reich Chamber of Culture & Music, the Volksgerichtshof and of Gestapo offices

Under certain circumstances and with legitimation, it is possible to gain access to the files.

References

Literature 

Babett Stach: Personenbezogene Unterlagen aus der Zeit des Nationalsozialismus. Das Bundesarchiv in Berlin und seine Bestände, insbesondere des ehemaligen amerikanischen Berlin Document Center (BDC). In: Herold-Jahrbuch N.F. 5 (2000), 149-186.
Stefan Heym: Eine wahre Geschichte. In: Ders. (Hrsg.): Die Kannibalen und andere Erzählungen. Leipzig 1953, 51-76.
Robert Wolfe: A Short History of the Berlin Document Center. In: The Holdings of the Berlin Document Center. A Guide to the Collections. Berlin 1994, XI-XXII.

External links 

 page at Bundesarchiv.de
 List of microfilmed copies held by the US National Archives
 April 1994 testimony before Congress about the transfer of the BDC from US to German hands, with detailed chronology since 1945 (on H-Net)
 "Taking the Paper Trail Instead of Memory Lane: OSI's Use of Ancient Foreign Documents in the Nazi Cases" U.S. Attorney's Bulletin, January 2006 by Gregory S. Gordon.

See also
Research Materials: Max Planck Society Archive

Archives in Germany
Organisations based in Berlin
20th century in Berlin
Historiography of Nazi Germany
Nuremberg trials